Leon Rippy (born October 30, 1949, Rock Hill, South Carolina) is an American character actor. Active on screen since 1983, Rippy has appeared in numerous films and recurring roles on television.  He is best known for his roles as Earl the Angel on the series Saving Grace, saloon owner Tom Nuttall on the series Deadwood and militiaman John Billings in The Patriot (2000).

Career
Rippy's acting career developed through appearances in regional theatrical productions. He founded and operated two theatre companies.  Rippy has appeared in more than seventy plays.  His non-acting occupations have included working with a circus and as a foreman of a cattle ranch. At one time he was regarded as an accomplished ballet dancer.

Rippy has worked with Roland Emmerich on seven movies: Moon 44 (1990), Eye of the Storm (1991), Universal Soldier (1992), Stargate (1994), The Thirteenth Floor (1999), The Patriot (2000), and Eight Legged Freaks (2002). He also had roles in The Alamo (2004) and The Lone Ranger (2013).

His television appearances include a guest role on Star Trek: The Next Generation ("The Neutral Zone"), Quantum Leap, Walker, Texas Ranger, Werewolf, Leverage, Six Feet Under, and Deadwood, a HBO series in which he played Tom Nuttall. Rippy co-starred in the TNT crime drama series Saving Grace. He also appeared in North and South as Sanders, and in Alcatraz as Dr. Beauregard.

Filmography

Awards and nominations

References

External links

Leon Rippy at HBO: Deadwood
About Saving Grace

1949 births
Male actors from South Carolina
American male film actors
American male television actors
Living people
People from Rock Hill, South Carolina
20th-century American male actors
21st-century American male actors